Alkan Air Ltd. is an airline headquartered in Whitehorse, Yukon, Canada. The company operates seven-day-a-week charter and air ambulance (medevac) services. The Whitehorse and Mayo (seasonal) bases generally focus on wheel and floatplane charter and medevac services in northern and western Canada and Alaska. The Nanaimo, BC base provides charter and medevac services, focused primarily in western Canada, the western United States and Mexico. From 2016 to 2018, Alkan also operated scheduled flights between Erik Nielsen Whitehorse International Airport and Watson Lake Airport.

History 

Alkan Air was formed in 1977 by Barry Watson and two Whitehorse businessmen, Win and Joe Muff. It was named in honour of the famous Alaska Highway or Al-Can Highway which skirts the City of Whitehorse. Hugh Kitchen became a partner in 1987 when Win and Joe Muff decided to sell their stake in the company in order to start a telecommunications business in Whitehorse.

The company began by operating a Cessna 206 on floats/skis and a Cessna 337 on wheels. Expansion soon followed and by 1987, when float and ski operations were discontinued, Alkan Air was one of the main providers of scheduled service in Yukon. In the early 1990s, the company gradually phased out scheduled flights in order to focus on charter operations. High performance, pressurized Beech King Airs were introduced in 1994.

Alkan Air primarily flies charter operations for hunting outfitters and government operations. Three Kings Airs are dedicated to flying medevacs for the Yukon Government.

In October 2015, Alkan Air opened a flight training school to accommodate a need in Yukon for people wanting to learn to fly. As of 2016, the flight school operates two Cessna 172's, a Piper PA-34 Seneca 3 and can train for Private and Commercial Licenses and multi-engine and instrument ratings. In addition, Alkan Air operates a Transport Canada certified simulator for instrument training.

Fleet 
As of December 2020, Transport Canada lists the following aircraft:

In addition Transport Canada lists a Cessna 206 and a DHC-3 Otter with cancelled certificates.

Accidents and incidents

On August 6, 2019, a Cessna 208B (C-FSKF) crashed into a mountain near Mayo Airport killing the pilot and the only passenger. The Transportation Safety Board of Canada (TSB) investigation report into the accident was released on July 29, 2020, and identified poor pilot decision making in conditions of poor weather in mountainous terrain as a major cause of the crash.

References

External links 

Alkan Air

Companies based in Whitehorse
Charter airlines of Canada
Airlines established in 1977
Regional airlines of Yukon
Seaplane operators